Ritchie Valens in Concert at Pacoima Jr. High is the third and final of the posthumously released "original" albums by Ritchie Valens. It consists of his only live performance ever recorded. It is also possibly the first live rock album.

Background
On December 10, 1958, Valens, having completed a recent tour of Hawaii, gave a performance at his old Pacoima Junior High School. The show was emceed by Gail Smith, a close friend of his who later became president of the Ritchie Valens Memorial Fan Club in Los Angeles. Valens' guitar and vocals were accompanied only by drummer Don Phillips. The concert was taped using a small portable tape recorder.

After Valens' untimely death on February 3, 1959, numerous Ritchie Valens Fan Clubs were formed all over the nation. By late 1960, with no further records released since the Ritchie album a year before, his manager Robert Keane received letters en masse from fan club members who were hoping there were more of Valens' songs to be released. Keane responded by obtaining the tape from the Pacoima Junior High show and pressing it to record.  To fill the "live" side of the album, an early demo of "Come On, Let's Go", bearing no resemblance to the released "hit" version, was added with live audience dubbed in. As Valens' entire Gold Star Studios master output had been released on his first two albums, side two was filled with unfinished demos recorded at Keane's home studio. Keane provided narrative descriptions of each track.

Track listing

External links

Ritchie Valens live albums
1960 live albums
Del-Fi Records live albums
Demo albums
Pacoima, Los Angeles